The 2005 NCAA Division III football season, part of the college football season organized by the NCAA at the Division III level in the United States, began in August 2005, and concluded with the NCAA Division III Football Championship, also known as the Stagg Bowl, in December 2005 at Salem Football Stadium in Salem, Virginia. The Mount Union Purple Raiders won their eighth Division III championship by defeating the Wisconsin–Whitewater Warhawks, 35−28. This was the first of eight subsequent championship games between Mount Union (3 wins) and Wisconsin–Whitewater (5 wins); only the 2012 Stagg Bowl featured a different team.

The Gagliardi Trophy, given to the most outstanding player in Division III football, was awarded to Brett Elliott, quarterback from Linfield.

Conference changes and new programs

Conference standings

Conference champions

Postseason
The 2005 NCAA Division III Football Championship playoffs were the 33rd annual single-elimination tournament to determine the national champion of men's NCAA Division III college football. The championship Stagg Bowl game was held at Salem Football Stadium in Salem, Virginia for the 13th time. The bracket for this field expanded from 28 to 32 teams, where it has remained.

Qualification
Twenty-one conferences met the requirements for an automatic ("Pool A") bid to the playoffs. Besides the NESCAC, which does not participate in the playoffs, five conferences had no Pool A bid. The PAC was in the first year of the two-year waiting period, while the ACFC, NWC, UAA, and UMAC failed to meet the seven-member requirement.

Schools not in Pool A conferences were eligible for Pool B. The number of Pool B bids was determined by calculating the ratio of Pool A conferences to schools in those conferences and applying that ratio to the number of Pool B schools. The 21 Pool A conferences contained 179 schools, an average of 8.5 teams per conference. Thirty-seven schools were in Pool B, enough for four bids.

The remaining seven playoff spots were at-large ("Pool C") teams.

Playoff bracket
{{32TeamBracket-Compact-NoSeeds-Byes
| RD1=First RoundCampus Sites
| RD2=Second RoundCampus Sites
| RD3=QuarterfinalsCampus Sites
| RD4=SemifinalsCampus Sites
| RD5=National Championship GameSalem Football StadiumSalem, Virginia

| team-width=155
| score-width=30

| RD1-team01=Linfield
| RD1-score01=63
| RD1-team02=Occidental
| RD1-score02=21

| RD1-team03=Concordia–Moorhead
| RD1-score03=27
| RD1-team04=Coe
| RD1-score04=14

| RD1-team05=Saint John's (MN)
| RD1-score05=62| RD1-team06=Monmouth (IL)
| RD1-score06=3

| RD1-team07=Wisconsin–Whitewater| RD1-score07=34| RD1-team08=Central (IA)
| RD1-score08=14

| RD1-team09=Mary Hardin–Baylor| RD1-score09=35| RD1-team10=Trinity (TX)
| RD1-score10=6

| RD1-team11=Wesley| RD1-score11=59| RD1-team12=Ferrum
| RD1-score12=14

| RD1-team13=Bridgewater (VA)| RD1-score13=30| RD1-team14=Washington & Jefferson
| RD1-score14=21

| RD1-team15=Thiel| RD1-score15=28| RD1-team16=Johns Hopkins
| RD1-score16=3

| RD1-team17=Wabash| RD1-score17=38| RD1-team18=Albion
| RD1-score18=20

| RD1-team19=Capital| RD1-score19=21| RD1-team20=North Central (IL)
| RD1-score20=19

| RD1-team21=Augustana (IL)| RD1-score21=49| RD1-team22=Lakeland
| RD1-score22=22

| RD1-team23=Mount Union| RD1-score23=49| RD1-team24=Mount St. Joseph
| RD1-score24=6

| RD1-team25=Delaware Valley| RD1-score25=37| RD1-team26=Curry
| RD1-score26=22

| RD1-team27=Hobart| RD1-score27=23| RD1-team28=Cortland
| RD1-score28=22

| RD1-team29=Rowan| RD1-score29=42| RD1-team30=Wilkes
| RD1-score30=3

| RD1-team31=Union (NY)| RD1-score31=55| RD1-team32=Ithaca
| RD1-score32=41

| RD2-team01=Linfield| RD2-score01=28| RD2-team02=Concordia–Moorhead
| RD2-score02=14

| RD2-team03=Saint John's (MN)
| RD2-score03=7
| RD2-team04=Wisconsin–Whitewater| RD2-score04=34| RD2-team05=Mary Hardin–Baylor
| RD2-score05=36
| RD2-team06=Wesley| RD2-score06=46| RD2-team07=Bridgewater (VA)| RD2-score07=24| RD2-team08=Thiel
| RD2-score08=13

| RD2-team09=Wabash
| RD2-score09=11
| RD2-team10=Capital| RD2-score10=14| RD2-team11=Augustana (IL)
| RD2-score11=7
| RD2-team12=Mount Union| RD2-score12=44| RD2-team13=Delaware Valley| RD2-score13=21| RD2-team14=Hobart
| RD2-score14=14

| RD2-team15=Rowan| RD2-score15=28| RD2-team16=Union (NY)
| RD2-score16=24

| RD3-team01=Linfield
| RD3-score01=41
| RD3-team02=Wisconsin–Whitewater| RD3-score02=44| RD3-team03=Wesley| RD3-score03=46| RD3-team04=Bridgewater (VA)
| RD3-score04=7

| RD3-team05=Mount Union| RD3-score05=34| RD3-team06=Capital
| RD3-score06=31

| RD3-team07=Delaware Valley
| RD3-score07=21
| RD3-team08=Rowan| RD3-score08=27| RD4-team01=Wisconsin–Whitewater| RD4-score01=58| RD4-team02=Wesley
| RD4-score02=6

| RD4-team03=Mount Union| RD4-score03=19| RD4-team04=Rowan
| RD4-score04=7

| RD5-team01=Wisconsin–Whitewater
| RD5-score01=28
| RD5-team02=Mount Union| RD5-score02=35'}}
* Overtime''

See also
2005 NCAA Division I-A football season
2005 NCAA Division I-AA football season
2005 NCAA Division II football season

References